Nana Agyenim Boateng is a Ghanaian politician known as the flag bearer of the United Front Party. He is one of the candidates who was disqualified from contesting in the 2016 general elections by the Electoral Commission of Ghana.

References 

Year of birth missing (living people)
Living people
Ghanaian politicians